Purplewashing is a compound word modeled on the term whitewash. The prefix "purple" is associated with feminism while the verb "wash" refers to the co-opting strategies that use minority rights to maintain or enhance structural forms of discrimination.

In the context of feminism, it is used to describe a variety of political and marketing strategies aimed at promoting countries, people, companies and other organizations through an appeal to gender equality. This marketing tactic has also been called "Femvertising", which was most discussed in Gillette Razor's #MeToo commercial aimed towards toxic masculinity.

The term is commonly used to denounce the use of feminism to justify what is perceived as xenophobic or Islamophobic policies.

The word is also used to criticize how Western countries that have not achieved complete gender equality justify this by pointing out that other countries (often majority Muslim) or cultures still have a worse quality of life for women.

Political 
There have been many well-known politicians who have said controversial statements regarding women yet continue to introduce schemes and policies that are for women’s development. A very well known Chief Minister who has introduced many reforms and policies for women empowerment campaigns, such as, Mission Shakti which hopes to raise awareness and tackle crime against women has said “Comparing women to energy, he says just like unbridled energy can be destructive and can go haywire, so too if the spirit of women is not controlled then it can prove dangerous.”Within the Spanish Army, there have been many legislative and formal changes to fight sexism. However, it has not altered the relationship between the patriarchy and militarism that remains today within the Spanish Army. The report of Centre Delas d’Estudis per la Pau analyzes the women in the Armed Force and how they are far from actually reaching the feminist milestone for equality in the areas of power. Once again demonstrating the militaristic logic and patriarchal domination. The mechanisms and behaviours are perpetuated, regardless of changes, due to the preformative patriarchy. Through certain strategies, the Army has purple washed and therefore instrumentalized women in order to create a false reality of equality and modernity in the Armed Forces.

Marketing 
Through marketing and political strategies that reinforce a commitment to gender equality, western countries use this as an image-cleaning. This marketing tactic has also been called, "Femvertising", which was most discussed in Gillette Razor's #MeToo commercial aimed towards toxic masculinity. In advertisement, women are often portrayed through gender stereotypes, the objectification of the female body and the little representation of women. The term “femvertising” gained popularity in 2014 after the iBlog magazine SheKnows defined it as “advertising that employs pro-female talent, messages, and imagery to empower women and girls.” Specifically due to its ability to question traditional gender stereotypes tied to women in advertising. Through “femvertising” marketers are able to reach female consumers as they use female empowerment to advertise.

One of the most well known examples today, the Dove Campaign for Real Beauty (2004) which aimed to help young women and children gain confidence. By bringing up the idea of physical traits and other stereotypical traits associated to females whether it was personality, role, or occupation, it made sure to raise awareness that everyone was beautiful. Therefore, Dove is known for being positive advocates for women when it comes to social standards as they have used feminism in their advertising. This strategy is now used by many other brands and companies to attract female consumers.

Social media is a way in which companies can further market to females. Social media platforms such as Instagram portray the usage of "femvertising". Ads on social media apps provide a means for brands to bolster products and will strategize the marketable content that the users interacts with. These advertisements are generated based on the users’ activity, increasing interest and therefore the probability of purchases and interaction. Social media feed that relates to females will drive the trends within these apps. Feminism is a popular way social media apps use female topics, such as campaigns for feminism or highlighting social issues involving females. The clothing company H&M designed a campaign titled "She's A Lady" in 2016 that was used on social media platforms. Campaigns as such online display the influence "femvertising" to invest in the interest of females.

See also 

Astroturfing
 Brigitte Vasallo
 Commodity feminism
 Ethnocentrism
 Feminationalism
 Greenwashing
 Homonationalism
 Intersectionality
 Islamic feminism
 Pinkwashing
 Redwashing
 Postcolonialism
Whitewashing

References 

Feminist economics